The Forbidden Rocks is a linear rock outcrop,  long, located on the western edge of the Christoffersen Heights and between Haskell Glacier and Walk Glacier, in the Jones Mountains of Antarctica. They were mapped by the University of Minnesota Jones Mountains Party, 1960–61, and so named by the party because the rocks were inaccessible from their northwest approach because of crevasse fields.

References 

Rock formations of Ellsworth Land